Heroes Manga Madrid, born as Salón del manga de Madrid and later on, ExpoManga (officially ) was a Spanish anime and manga convention held annually in Madrid. Coupled with the Heroes Comic Madrid (known previously as Expocomic) and it became the second largest anime convention in Spain after  the Salón del Manga de Barcelona. Organized at first by AEAC, was later on bought by the Dutch company EasyFairs, then Conceptum!. It was held in several locations during its first years, then it settled in Madrid's Casa de Campo fairground, to be moved into the IFEMA 2017-2019. The 2019 edition was cancelled citing organization problems, promising to come back in 2020, failing to do so and with no further notices from the organizers.

References

Defunct anime conventions
Culture in Madrid
Recurring events established in 2001
1995 establishments in Spain
Events in Madrid